The 2013–14 English Hockey League season took place from September 2013 until April 2014. The end of season playoffs were held on the 5 & 6 April for the men and the 12 & 13 of April for the women. The Men's Championship was won by Beeston and the Women's Championship was won by Surbiton.

The Men's Cup was won by Cannock and the Women's Cup was won by Surbiton.

Men's Premier Division League Standings

Results

Women's Investec Premier Division League Standings

Play Offs

Semi-finals

Finals

Men's Cup

Quarter-finals

Semi-finals

Final
(Held at the Highfields Sports Club, Nottingham on 3 May)

Women's Cup

Quarter-finals

Semi-finals

Final
(Held at Highfields Hockey Centre, Nottingham on 26 April)

References

England Hockey League seasons
field hockey
field hockey
England